Harry Koch may refer to:

 Harry Koch (businessman) (1867–1942), Dutch-born American businessman
 Harry Koch (German footballer) (born 1969), German footballer and coach
 Harry Koch (Swiss footballer) (1930-2012), Swiss footballer
 Harry Eduard Ottokar Koch, Estonian politician

See also
Harold M. Koch (born 1932), Roman Catholic priest from Chicago